V. O. C. Nagar railway station is one of the railway station if the Chennai Central–Gummidipoondi section of the Chennai Suburban Railway. It was previously known as Tondiarpet Marshalling Yard railway station. It serves the neighbourhood of Tondiarpet, a suburb of Chennai, and is located 6 km north of Chennai Central railway station. It has an elevation of 5 m above sea level.

The railway station is mostly used by railway employees since it is very close to many railway establishments. This station is mostly visited by rail fans for rail fanning since it has a big railway yard. Chennai Port Trust ground is close to this railway station. However, it lacks several basic amenities.

History

The railway station was initially known as Tondiarpet marshalling yard railway station and later renamed to V. O. C. Nagar. The lines at the station were electrified on 13 April 1979, with the electrification of the Chennai Central–Gummidipoondi section.

See also

 Chennai Suburban Railway
 Railway stations in Chennai

References

External links
 V. O. C. Nagar station at Indiarailinfo.com

Stations of Chennai Suburban Railway
Railway stations in Chennai